Belize Rural Central is an electoral constituency in the Belize District represented in the House of Representatives of the National Assembly of Belize since 2020 by Dolores Balderamos-García of the People's United Party (PUP).

Profile

The Belize Rural Central constituency was created for the 1993 general election by a split of the existing Belize Rural South constituency. Out of the 13 Belize District constituencies it is one of three located outside the Belize City limits, consisting of the southern half of the Belize District mainland. It includes Ladyville and the Philip S. W. Goldson International Airport.

Area Representatives

Elections

References

Belizean House constituencies established in 1993
Political divisions in Belize
Belize Rural Central